Dahegam is a city and a municipality in Gandhinagar district  in the state of Gujarat, India.

History
During 1257 AD, Gujarat was under the Khilji dynasty. Jafar Khan of the Tughlak dynasty had overpowered King Ram Ray Rathod of Idar. The Mughals took control of a majority of the Gujarat during this period. Later, the Marathas administered the region during 1753 AD. Damaji Gaikwad is considered to be most significant ruler. Dahegam taluka was founded in 1875 AD during Gaekwad rule and it soon become a major political center in the area.  It was conferred municipality or nagarpalika status in 1987 as a part of Ahmedabad district.  When Ahmedabad district was halved in 1998, Dahegam became a part of Gandhinagar district.

Geography
It has an average elevation of 73 metres (239 feet).

Demographics
 India census, Dahegam had a population of 38,083. Males constitute 52% of the population and females 48%. Dahegam has an average literacy rate of 65%, higher than the national average of 59.5%: male literacy is 73% and, female literacy is 58%. In Dahegam, 14% of the population is under 6 years of age.

The taluka has different kinds of communities living with great harmony. Koli Community is the majority in the Dehgam Taluka. Though the Dahegam has different religious communities, all are living in unity. There are two big statues in this town, one of Babasaheb Ambedkar and other Sardar Vallabhbhai Patel.

Transport
Nandol Dehegam railway station is situated on Ahmedabad–Udaipur Line under the Ahmedabad railway division.

References

Cities and towns in Gandhinagar district